Out of Jimmy's Head (abbreviated as OOJH) is an American teen sitcom. It was advertised as the first Cartoon Network original series in its genre, and is based on the network's 2006 film Re-Animated. The series was produced by Cartoon Network Studios and Brookwell McNamara Entertainment (the latter known for Disney's shows such as Even Stevens and That's So Raven). It was created by Tim McKeon and Adam Pava, who were originally writers for Foster's Home for Imaginary Friends, As Told by Ginger, and The Life and Times of Juniper Lee, as well as the creators of Weighty Decisions short on Cartoon Network's Sunday Pants anthology series.

The series premiered on Cartoon Network on September 14, 2007, to coincide with the release of the Re-Animated film on DVD, and was the only network series to be affected by the 2007 Writers Guild of America strike. Then made its Canadian premiere on Teletoon on Saturday, September 6, 2008. It also aired on Boomerang in Australia. The U.S. run of the series ended with the airing of the series' final episode on May 29, 2008. The series never streamed on HBO Max even though several other Cartoon Network shows like The Amazing World of Gumball and Adventure Time did.

Although Renegade Animation did the pilot film's animation, they did not return to work on the series. Cartoon Network did not acknowledge the series again until 2018, where Golly had a cameo role in the OK K.O.! Let's Be Heroes episode, Crossover Nexus, along with a small cameo with Dolly and Crocko in the 20th anniversary mural from 2012.

Like many shows during Cartoon Network's late-2000s dalliance with live-action programming, this show is also infamous for being a more modern example of lost media, due to Cartoon Network erasing the show from all online streaming websites, including its own, that formerly had episodes of the series for sale, and while the show did get a DVD release exclusively in the United Kingdom, it only contains three episodes of the entire show. As of today, only 10 episodes of the show are available to watch online in English, while the other ten episodes can only be watched in foreign-language dubs.

Premise
The series follows the back-story established by the film. After receiving a brain transplant from a honorable cartoonist following an accident, 13-year-old Jimmy Roberts finds himself inexplicably capable of seeing and communicating with the famed animated characters created by the cartoonist, resulting in a variety of odd predicaments or situations at the hands of Jimmy's interactions with these hallucinations. However, he also must handle the deceased cartoonist's conspiring and scheming son, Sonny Appleday, with intentions of murdering Jimmy and obtaining his father's brain so he may gain notoriety as a cartoonist, and take over the world.

Cast

Main
 Dominic Janes as Jimmy Roberts
 Tinashe as Robin Wheeler
 Bil Dwyer as Ken Roberts
 Jon Kent Ethridge II as Craig Wheeler
 Rhea Lando as Yancy Roberts
 Matt Knudsen as Sonny Appleday
 Carlos Alazraqui as voice of Golly Gopher
 Ellen Greene as voice of Dolly Gopher
 Tom Kenny as voice of Tux the Penguin
 Brian Posehn as voice of Crocco the Alligator

Recurring
 Rachel Quaintance as Louisa Roberts
 Jonina Gable as Becky
 Christian Vandal as Logan
 Austin Rogers as Animal Loving Kevin
 Terrence Hardy, Jr. as Easily Excited Kid
 Caden Michael Gray as Crazy Jake
 Katelin Petersen as Hildy Jeffries
 Nicole Smolen as Young Yancy
 Nolan Gould as Young Jimmy
 Ryan Eggold as Mike the Werewolf

Episodes

Pilot film (2006)

Season 1 (2007–08)

Broadcast and reception

For Out of Jimmy's Head, Cartoon Network ordered 20 episodes, which were filmed from May to September 2007. In airing the series, Cartoon Network split the series into two seasons. The first season of the series premiered in September 2007 and lasted 13 episodes. The channel later aired the remaining seven episodes as the second season, starting in March 2008, one week after the airing of episode 13, which was considered part of the first season. The series' hiatus between seasons (actually between episodes 12 and 13) coincided with the 2007 Writers Guild of America strike, which led many to believe that writing on the series had been interrupted. In fact, writing and production for all episodes had been completed in September. However, the strike did prevent the writers from being involved in editing and post-production, including the infamous decision to add a laugh track beginning with episode 8, "Skate Night". Due to the strike, the series was not renewed.

It was the last Cartoon Network original series to be broadcast in full screen 4:3 before Cartoon Network started its own high-definition feed, although it was produced in a widescreen aspect ratio of 16:9.

Neil Genzlinger of The New York Times wrote: "Cast aside all that clutter, though, and this is really just another show about a seventh grader trying to fit in. It’s also a show with a sly sense of humor when it’s not being self-consciously frentic", and praised Bil Dwyer for his comedic role. Emily Ashby of Common Sense Media rated the show 3 out of 5 stars and wrote: "It's just fun fluff. It is worth noting that the show is an improvement on the movie in terms of Jimmy's increased confidence and ability to fend off peer pressure, which is certainly a welcome change".

Despite the negative reviews from critics, the show received some accolades: the program's cast won a combined Young Artist Award in 2008 for "Best Young Ensemble Performance in a TV Series", then was nominated at the same ceremony for "Best Family Television Series", and finally Tinashe Kachingwe with Caden Michael Gray were nominated for "Best Performance in a TV Series – Supporting Young Actress" and "Best Performance in a TV Series – Recurring Young Actor", respectively.

References

External links

 Out of Jimmy's Head on IMDb

2007 American television series debuts
2008 American television series endings
2000s American school television series
2000s American teen sitcoms
American flash animated television series
American television series with live action and animation
Cartoon Network original programming
Television series by Cartoon Network Studios
Cryonics in fiction
English-language television shows
Middle school television series
Television series about teenagers
Television series by Brookwell McNamara Entertainment